Callulina meteora, the Nguru warty frog, is a species of frog in the family Brevicipitidae, endemic to Tanzania. It lives in the Nguru South Forest Reserve between 1980 and 2100 meters above sea level.

This frog has brightly colored glands and a metallic sheen to its skin.

References

Frogs of Africa
meteora
Endemic fauna of Tanzania
Amphibians described in 2011